Chhatrapati Yadav is an Indian politician from the Indian National Congress and a Member of the Bihar Legislative Assembly representing Khagaria. He got elected for the first time in the 2020 Bihar Legislative Assembly election. He is a son of a former politician, legislator and minister in the Bihar Government, Rajendra Prasad Yadav, who used to contest elections from Hasanpur legislative constituency of Bihar. He has been touring his constituency and focusing on civic and infrastructural issues.

References

Living people
Bihar MLAs 2020–2025
Indian National Congress politicians from Bihar
Year of birth missing (living people)
People from Khagaria district